Harriette Pilbeam (born 4 May 1993), known professionally as Hatchie, is an Australian singer-songwriter and musician. She has released an EP, Sugar & Spice (2018) and two studio albums: Keepsake (2019) and Giving the World Away (2022).

History
Harriette Pilbeam was born on 4 May 1993 in Brisbane. She started singing as a child, later learning guitar and bass in her teen years, as well as piano and clarinet later on. She studied entertainment, music, and management in college before pursuing live music as a creative outlet. She is the bassist and vocalist of the indie rock band Babaganouj, as well as a former member of the band Go Violets, which disbanded in 2014.

Pilbeam made her solo debut under the name Hatchie, her family nickname, with the release of her debut single "Try" in May 2017. The single gained her significant attention in her native Australia. She then signed with Ivy League Records and released her second single "Sure" in November 2017. In January 2018, she also signed with Double Double Whammy and Heavenly Recordings. In February, "Sure" was remixed by Cocteau Twins' guitarist Robin Guthrie. She released two more singles, "Sugar & Spice" and "Sleep", before releasing her debut EP Sugar & Spice on 25 May. The EP consists of the four previously released singles as well as one additional track, titled "Bad Guy".

On 24 October 2018, Hatchie released a new single titled "Adored" for Adult Swim's singles series. On 26 February 2019, Hatchie announced her debut studio album, Keepsake, and released the lead single "Without a Blush". It was followed by two more singles, "Stay with Me" and "Obsessed", before the album was released on 21 June.

On 14 September 2021, after announcing that she had signed with the Secretly Canadian label, Hatchie released the single "This Enchanted". On 19 January 2022, Hatchie released another single "Quicksand" off her second album, Giving the World Away. It was released on 22 April 2022. On 9 March 2023, she announced the release of the album's deluxe edition which will be digitally available on 7 April 2023.

Musical style
Stereogum described Hatchie's music as "a cosmic concoction of dream-pop and shoegaze." Her sound has been compared to various acts, some which she herself cites as influences, including Cocteau Twins, the Sundays, Mazzy Star, Natalie Imbruglia, and the Cranberries. She also cited My Bloody Valentine, Kate Bush, Alvvays, Siouxsie Sioux, Kylie Minogue, Sky Ferreira, Wolf Alice, Chairlift, and Carly Rae Jepsen among her influences.

Personal life
Hatchie married her fiancé Joe Agius (aka RINSE) on 24 November 2021. The wedding ceremony was held at Graceland Wedding Chapel in Las Vegas, Nevada.

Discography

Albums

Extended plays

Singles

As lead artist

As a featured artist

Awards and nominations

AIR Awards
The Australian Independent Record Awards (commonly known informally as AIR Awards) is an annual awards night to recognise, promote and celebrate the success of Australia's Independent Music sector.

|-
| AIR Awards of 2019
| Hatchie 
| Breakthrough Independent Artist
| 
|-

J Award
The J Awards are an annual series of Australian music awards that were established by the Australian Broadcasting Corporation's youth-focused radio station Triple J. They commenced in 2005.

|-
| J Awards of 2019
| Keepsake
| Australian Album of the Year
| 
|-

National Live Music Awards
The National Live Music Awards (NLMAs) are a broad recognition of Australia's diverse live industry, celebrating the success of the Australian live scene. The awards commenced in 2016.

|-
| rowspan="2"| National Live Music Awards of 2019
| rowspan="2"| Hatchie 
| Live Pop Act of the Year
| 
|-
| International Live Achievement (Solo)
| 
|-

Notes

References

External links

 
 

1993 births
21st-century Australian singers
21st-century Australian women singers
21st-century bass guitarists
Australian bass guitarists
Australian singer-songwriters
Australian women singer-songwriters
Ivy League Records artists
Living people
Musicians from Brisbane
Women bass guitarists
Secretly Canadian artists
Heavenly Recordings artists